Occupy Salem was a collaboration in Salem, Oregon based on the Occupy Wall Street movement which began in New York City on September 17, 2011. Occupy Salem has included peaceful protests and demonstrations.

As of June 2012, Occupy Salem had continued to engage in organized meetings, events and actions.

History
Beginning on October 10, protesters began camping out at Willson Park in Salem, and also set up tents in a parking lot adjacent to the capitol building. The encampment included a kitchen area and a first aid station. On the same day, hundreds of protesters rallied at the state Capitol. Former Salem Mayor Mike Swaim was one of the participants in this rally. On October 12, 2011 protesters were warned not to camp at a Salem park, the violation of which would result in arrests. Protesters moved their belongings and themselves out of the park, and returned the next morning. It was reported that local law enforcement considered the protest peaceful in nature.

Oregon state officials on November 14 ordered the Salem protesters to leave the encampment, where they had been stationed since October 10. The officials also said that the protesters were required to "remove all tents, waste, portable toilets and other structures from Willson Park by the end of the month". In response, the protesters decided to have "daily demonstrations" at a bridge nearby the park and to also have group meetings in Marion State Park instead.

See also
 List of global Occupy protest locations

References

Further reading
 Collins, Timm (October 5, 2011.) "'Occupy Salem' hopes for changes in economic system." Statesman Journal. Accessed October 2011.
 (October 11, 2011.) "'Occupy Salem' protest camp given extension." MSNBC. Accessed October 2011.

External links
 

2011 in Oregon
Salem
Organizations based in Salem, Oregon
Culture of Salem, Oregon
History of Salem, Oregon